Samsung Sports is Samsung's multi-sport club and sports marketing department in South Korea.

Own sports teams

Professional

Amateur

Sponsorship

Organization 
 International Olympic Committee
 FINA
 Asian Football Confederation
 Confederation of African Football
 International Association of Athletics Federations
 International Hockey Federation
 Union Cycliste Internationale
 Korean Olympic Committee
 Korea Association of Athletics Federations
 Korea Skating Union
 Korea Women's Football Federation
 United States Olympic Committee
 British Olympic Association
 Italian National Olympic Committee
 Swedish Olympic Committee
 Belgian Olympic Committee
 National Olympic Committee of Ukraine
 Jordan Olympic Committee
 Sports Federation and Olympic Committee of Hong Kong, China
 Singapore National Olympic Council
 Australian Olympic Committee
 The Football Association
 Austrian Football Association
 USA Basketball
 Australian Rugby Union
 Rugby Football Union
 Hockey Canada

Competition 
 Olympic Games
 Paralympic Games
 Universiade
 Youth Olympic Games
 IAAF World Championships in Athletics
 IAAF World Indoor Championships in Athletics
 IAAF Diamond League
 FINA World Aquatics Championships
 ISU Short Track Speed Skating World Cup
 UCI Track Cycling World Cup
 World Rowing Championships
 World Rowing Cup
 FIVB Volleyball Men's World Championship
 FIVB Volleyball World League
 Asian Games
 FIFA World Cup Asian Qualifiers
 AFC Asian Cup
 Africa Cup of Nations
 Copa Libertadores
 Austrian Cup
 Beach Soccer Intercontinental Cup
 FIBA EuroBasket
 FIBA 3x3 World Championships
 La Liga
 National Basketball Association
 NBA Summer League
 Major League Baseball
 Samsung Securities Cup
 PGA Championship
 Samsung World Championship
 Asian Amateur Championship
 The Samsung Marathon of Tel Aviv- Israel
 Davao Pro-am Golf Tournament
 NASCAR
 Test match (rugby league)
 Super Rugby
 KBO League Post Season
 Korea National League
 WK League
 Women's Korean Basketball League
 Chinese Super League
 Italian Women's Volleyball League
 Samsung Cup World Go Championship
 Copa Samsung
 University Athletic Association of the Philippines
 Subroto Cup
 Samsung MOTG Freestyle World Championship
 World Match Racing Tour
 World Combat Games
 ASP World Tour
 Triple Crown of Surfing
 Whistler Blackcomb
 World Cyber Games

Individual 
  Yuna Kim
  Kim Ja-in
  Chung Hyeon
  David Beckham
  Lionel Messi
  Paulo Henrique Ganso
  Junior dos Santos
  LeBron James
  Manny Pacquiao
  David Ortiz
  Usain Bolt
  Maria Sharapova
  Ana Ivanovic
  Li Na
  James Magnussen
  Ahmed Kelly
  Taku Hiraoka
 Team Samsung (2010 Winter Olympics, 2012 Summer Olympics and 2014 Asian Games)
  Team Samsung (2010 Vancouver): Wayne Gretzky, Jarome Iginla, Hayley Wickenheiser
  Team Samsung (2012 London): Zara Phillips, Phillips Idowu, Victoria Pendleton, Laura Trott, Alex Partridge, Jenna Randall, Daniel Purvis, Emily Pidgeon, Keith Cook, Jon Pollock, Sally Brown / David Beckham (Honorary ambassador)
  Team Samsung (2012 London): Valentina Vezzali, Rossano Galtarossa, Sara Morganti, Silvia Salis, Clemente Russo, Luca Dotto, Stefano Tempesti, Aldo Montano, Tania Cagnotto, Elisa Santoni
  Team Malaysia (2012 London): Fatehah Mustapa, Khairulnizam Afendy, Azizulhasni Awang, Lee Chong Wei, Pandelela Rinong, Nur Suryani Mohd Taibi, Cheng Chu Sian, Yu Peng Kean
  Team Samsung (2014 Incheon): Park Tae-hwan, Kim Nam-hun, Kim Yong-woong, Kong Tae-hyun, Youm Eun-ho
  Team Samsung (2014 Incheon): Ma Long, Zhang Peimeng, Xu Anqi
  Team Samsung (2014 Incheon): Pornchai Kaokaew, Wassana Winatho, Nootsara Tomkom, Chatchai Butdee
  Team Samsung (2014 Incheon): Lee Chong Wei, Pandelela Rinong
  Team Samsung (2014 Incheon): Parupalli Kashyap, P. V. Sindhu, Deepika Kumari, Gagan Narang, Manavjit Singh Sandhu, Malaika Goel, Abhinav Bindra, Babita Kumari, Yogeshwar Dutt, Vinesh Phogat, Mary Kom, Devendro Singh
  Team Samsung (2014 Incheon): Laith Al-Bashtawi, Ihab Al-Matbouli, Reham Abu Ghazaleh, Yahya Abu Tabaikh, Dana Haidar
 Samsung GALAXY Team (2014 Winter Olympics, 2016 Summer Olympics and 2018 Winter Olympics)
  (2014 Sochi): Evgeni Malkin, Tatiana Borodulina, Elizaveta Tuktamysheva, Liudmila Privivkova, Serafim Pikalov, Evgeny Ustyugov, Sergey Shilov, Nikita Kriukov, Maxim Trankov and Tatiana Volosozhar / Maria Sharapova (Honorary ambassador)
  (2014 Sochi): Magdalena Neuner, Isabella Laböck, Severin Freund, Anna Schaffelhuber
  (2014 Sochi): Eve Muirhead, James Woods, Billy Morgan, Elise Christie, Shelley Rudman, Kelly Gallagher, Charlotte Evans
  (2014 Sochi): Armin Zöggeler, Christof Innerhofer, Arianna Fontana, Omar Visintin, Melania Corradini
  (2014 Sochi): Alexis Pinturault, Tessa Worley, Vincent Gauthier-Manuel
  (2014 Sochi): Ireen Wüst, Bell Berghuis, Bibian Mentel
  (2014 Sochi): Hermann Maier, Benjamin Maier, Miriam Kastlunger, Wolfgang Linger, Andreas Linger, Christina Ager, Thomas Pöck, Gregor Schlierenzauer, Claudia Lösch, Anna Fenninger
  (2014 Sochi): Kai Mahler, Fabian Bösch, Giulia Tanno, Patrick Burgener, David Hablützel, Fanny Smith
  (2014 Sochi): Yosyf Penyak, Andriy Deryzemlya, Annamari Chundak
  (2014 Sochi): Piotr Żyła, Katarzyna Bachleda-Curuś, Andrzej Szczęsny
  (2014 Sochi): Henrik Lundqvist, Anna Holmlund, Victor Öhling Norberg, Frida Hansdotter, Helene Ripa
  (2014 Sochi): Aksel Lund Svindal, Bastian Juell, Hedda Berntsen, Mariann Marthinsen, Ståle Sandbech
  (2014 Sochi): Petteri Nummelin, Jouni Pellinen, Andreas Romar, Katja Saarinen
  (2014 Sochi): Evan Strong
  (2014 Sochi): Steven Stamkos, Hayley Wickenheiser, Greg Westlake, Marie-Ève Drolet, Michael Gilday
  (2014 Sochi): Alex Pullin, Scotty James, Jessica Gallagher
  (2014 Sochi): Lee Sang-hwa, Lee Seung-hoon, Mo Tae-bum
  (2014 Sochi): Jia Zongyang, Xu Mengtao, Li Nina, Qi Guangpu
  (2016 Rio): Aldo Montano, Clemente Russo, Frank Chamizo Marquez, Tania Cagnotto, Erika Fasana, Marta Menegatti, Martina Caironi
  (2018 PyeongChang): Christof Innerhofer, Sofia Goggia, Dorothea Wierer, Omar Visintin
 GALAXY 11 (2014 FIFA World Cup)
 Manager:  Franz Beckenbauer
 Players:  Lionel Messi (captain),  Mario Götze,  Oscar,  Wu Lei,  Stephan El Shaarawy,  Victor Moses,  Radamel Falcao,  Lee Chung-yong,  Iker Casillas,  Wayne Rooney,  Landon Donovan,  Aleksandr Kerzhakov,  Cristiano Ronaldo
 Avengers: Age of Ultron:  Lionel Messi (Iron Man),  Eddie Lacy (Hulk),  John John Florence (Thor),  Fabian Cancellara (Hawkeye),  Yoshihiro Akiyama ( Chu Seong-hoon)

Sports team

National team 
  Team Korea
  Team USA
  Team GB
  Team Singapore
  Italia Team
  Swedish Olympic Team
  Belgian Olympic Team
  Australian Olympic Team
  Jordan Olympic Team
  Hong Kong Olympic Team
  Brazil national football team
  England national football team
  Austria national football team
  England national rugby union team
  Australia national rugby union team
  South Africa national rugby union team
  Canada national ice hockey team
  Canada national short track speed skating team
  China national ski team
  Jamaica national bobsleigh team

Club 
  Club Atlético Vélez Sarsfield (Former)
  C.D. Guadalajara
  C.F. Pachuca
  Real Madrid C.F.
  Juventus F.C.
  Chelsea (Former)
  Wimbledon (Former)
  Royal Thai Police (Former)
  Brøndby IF  (Former)
  Olympiacos F.C.
  Vác FC  (Former)
  Leinster Rugby
  Banbridge RFC
  Frankfurt Universe
  BMW Motorsport
  FC Köln (Former)
  Eintracht Frankfurt (Former)
  Samsung Smart Motorsport
  Honda Racing British Superbike team
  Trek Factory Racing
  Lampre-Merida
  MTN-Qhubeka
  Mumbai Indians

Facilities 

 Samsung Training Center
 Samsung Leports Center
 Suwon Samsung Bluewings Club House - Suwon Samsung Bluewings
 Samsung Lions Ballpark - Samsung Lions
 Challenge Camp - Samsung Electronics Athletic Club
 Samsung Equestrian Center - Samsung Electronics Equestrian Team
 Hanullim Gymnasium - Samsung Electro-Mechanics Badminton Club

Social contribution 
 Keunnarae Program
 Dream Camp
 Therapeutic Riding
 I see your dreams

References

External links 

 Samsung Sports - Official website, Facebook , Naver blog , Tistory blog , YouTube 
 Samsung Sport - Facebook
 Suwon Samsung Bluewings - Official website, Facebook , Twitter , Instagram , Kakao Story , Naver blog , YouTube 
 Samsung Lions - Official website, Facebook , Twitter , YouTube 
 Seoul Samsung Thunders - Official website , Facebook , Twitter , YouTube 
 Yongin Samsung Blueminx - Official website , Facebook 
 Daejeon Samsung Fire Bluefangs - Official website , Facebook 
 Samsung Galaxy Pro Game Team - Official website , Facebook 
 Samsung Electronics Athletic Club - Official website
 Samsung Electronics Equestrian Team - Official website
 Samsung Securities Tennis Club - Official website  
 S-1 Taekwondo Club - Official website 

 
Multi-sport clubs in South Korea
Sports companies
Sports marketing